Paule Moris (28 December 1932 – 22 March 2021) was a French alpine skier. She competed in two events at the 1956 Winter Olympics.

References

External links
 

1932 births
2021 deaths
French female alpine skiers
Olympic alpine skiers of France
Alpine skiers at the 1956 Winter Olympics
Sportspeople from Savoie